Survive or Die is a 2018 Australian action film about a 16-year-old girl who escapes to Australia on a refugee boat steered by a people smuggling ring's captain. It is written and directed by Daniel Okoduwa & Michael Kang starring Felino Dolloso, Emmanuella Samuel, Caroline McQuade and Hawa Barnes.

Cast
Felino Dolloso
Emmanuella Samuel
Caroline McQuade
Tino Iheme
Salahuddin Ayubi
Rico Banderas
Craig Bourke
Frederick Hama
Oge Obiokolie
Glen Nutkaze Peters
Robin Royce Queree
Sarina Sainju

Release
Survive or Die premiered at the AACTA Film Fest in 2018 and released on Amazon Prime Video in 2020.

Critical reception
Action on Film Festival review says, "Difficult to watch, harder to come to grips with than a grizzly bear, this movie chills you to the bone. After that, you begin to understand just how important immigration is to the lives of millions of people around the world."

Accolades
Best Feature Film, Universe Multicultural Film Festival 2019 in Los Angeles California USA.
Winner, Award of Recognition in Accolade Awards USA.
3rd Finalist in the Suspense Thriller Category, Indie Gathering Film Festival in Cleveland, Ohio, USA.
Best Indie Feature, Vegas Movie Awards 2019, USA.
Best Music Score, Jamie Murgatroyd, Mediterranean Film Festival Cannes 2018.
AFIN – International Film Festival Brisbane Australia.
Action On Film International Film Festival, USA.
HOLLYWOOD DREAMS FILM FEST In Las Vegas, USA.
Auckland International Film Festival New Zealand 2018.
World Music & Independent Film Festival 2019, USA
 Best Actress Hawa Barnes, Best Director, Hollywoodz Dreams Film Festival, USA.

References

External links

2018 films
2018 action films
Australian action films
Films set in Australia
Films about impact events
2010s English-language films